Corbin is an unincorporated community in Bartow County, in the U.S. state of Georgia.

History
A post office called Corbin was established in 1887, and closed in 1902. The community was named for John Corbin, an early settler.

References

Unincorporated communities in Bartow County, Georgia
Unincorporated communities in Georgia (U.S. state)